Yankee White is an administrative nickname for a background check undertaken in the United States of America for Department of Defense personnel and contractor employees working with the president and vice president. Obtaining such clearance requires, in part, a Single Scope Background Investigation (SSBI) which is conducted under the manuals of the U.S. Defense Counterintelligence and Security Agency.

Individuals with Yankee White clearance undergo extensive background investigation. The Yankee White clearance includes requirements of U.S. citizenship and unquestionable loyalty to the United States.

Policy and implementation
The initial directive detailing the checks required was DoD Directive 5210.55, "Selection of DoD Military and Civilian Personnel and Contractor Employees for Assignment to Presidential Support Activities" issued on July 6, 1977. This was revised on 15 December 1998. DoD Instruction 5210.87 contains detailed information for the implementation of the policy, assignment of responsibilities and prescription of procedures to be followed. The administrative nickname "Yankee White" is referred to in the implementing instruction.

Clearance categories
There are three categories of Yankee White clearance.

 Category one clearance is required for selected personnel serving in extremely sensitive positions in direct support of the president or vice president. This includes:
 White House Military Office (WHMO)
 Director, Airlift Operations Office
 Director, Presidential Contingency Programs Office
 Director, Special Programs Office
 National Security Advisor
 Military Aides to the President and Vice President
 Director, White House Medical Unit
 Chief, US Army Transportation Agency, White House
 Food Service Coordinator of the White House Staff Mess
 Commander and Deputy Commander, White House Communications Agency
 Presidential Pilot and Deputy Presidential Pilot, 89th Airlift Wing, Andrews AFB
 Commanding Officer and Executive Officer, Marine Helicopter Squadron One (HMX-1)
 Commanding Officer and Executive Officer, Naval Support Facility Thurmont, MD (Camp David)
 Other personnel as determined by the WHMO director and the deputy assistant to the vice president for national security affairs
 Category two clearance is required for personnel assigned on a permanent or full-time basis to duties in direct support of the president or vice president (including the office staff of the WHMO director and all individuals under his or her control). This includes but is not limited to:
 Presidential aircrew and associated maintenance and security personnel
 White House Communications Agency personnel
 White House Transportation Agency personnel
 White House Staff Mess personnel
 White House Medical Unit personnel
 DoD personnel assigned to the Office of the Vice President
 Personnel assigned to the Naval Support Facility Thurmont, MD, more commonly known as "Camp David". 
 Employees of contractor firms who provide recurring services or who require unescorted access to Presidential support areas (PSAs), activities, or equipment—including the maintenance of the Presidential retreat or Vice President's residence, communications, aircraft, or facilities
 Principals of those firms used for PSAs who have direct involvement in the contract
 Category three clearance is required for personnel assigned to honor guard units, ceremonial units, and military bands who perform at presidential or vice presidential functions and facilities.

See also 
 Presidential Service Badge
 Security clearance

References

External links
 Presidential Service Association

Presidency of the United States
United States government secrecy
Vice presidency of the United States